King Philip's War (sometimes called the First Indian War, Metacom's War, Metacomet's War, Pometacomet's Rebellion, or Metacom's Rebellion) was an armed conflict in 1675–1676 between indigenous inhabitants of New England and New England colonists and their indigenous allies. The war is named for Metacom, the Wampanoag chief who adopted the name Philip because of the friendly relations between his father Massasoit and the Mayflower Pilgrims. The war continued in the most northern reaches of New England until the signing of the Treaty of Casco Bay on April 12, 1678.

Massasoit had maintained a long-standing alliance with the colonists. Metacom, his younger son, became tribal chief in 1662 after Massasoit's death. Metacom, however, forsook his father's alliance between the Wampanoags and the colonists after repeated violations by the colonists. The colonists insisted that the 1671 peace agreement should include the surrender of Native guns; then three Wampanoags were hanged in Plymouth Colony in 1675 for the murder of another Wampanoag, which increased tensions. Native raiding parties attacked homesteads and villages throughout Massachusetts, Rhode Island, Connecticut, and Maine over the next six months, and the colonial militia retaliated. The Narragansetts remained neutral, but some Narragansetts participated in raids of colonial strongholds and militia, so colonial leaders deemed them to be in violation of peace treaties. The colonies assembled the largest army New England had yet mustered, consisting of 1,000 militia and 150 Native allies. Governor Josiah Winslow marshaled them to attack the Narragansetts in November 1675. They attacked and burned Native villages throughout Rhode Island territory, culminating with the attack on the Narragansetts' main fort in the Great Swamp Fight. An estimated 600 Narragansetts were killed, and their coalition was taken over by Narragansett sachem Canonchet. They pushed back the borders of the Massachusetts Bay, Plymouth, and Rhode Island colonies, burning towns as they went, including Providence in March 1676. However, the colonial militia overwhelmed the Native coalition. By the end of the war, the Wampanoags and their Narragansett allies were almost completely destroyed. On August 12, 1676, Metacom fled to Mount Hope, where he was killed by the militia.

The war was the greatest calamity in seventeenth-century New England and is considered by many to be the deadliest war in Colonial American history. In the space of little more than a year, 12 of the region's towns were destroyed and many more were damaged, the economy of Plymouth and Rhode Island Colonies was all but ruined and their population was decimated, losing one-tenth of all men available for military service. More than half of New England's towns were attacked by Natives. Hundreds of Wampanoags and their allies were publicly executed or enslaved, and the Wampanoags were left effectively landless.

King Philip's War began the development of an independent American identity. The New England colonists faced their enemies without support from any European government or military, and this began to give them a group identity separate and distinct from Britain.

Historical context

Plymouth Colony was established in 1620 with significant early help from local Natives, particularly Squanto and Massasoit. Subsequent colonists founded Salem, Boston, and many small towns around Massachusetts Bay between 1628 and 1640, during a time of increased English immigration. The colonists progressively expanded throughout the territories of the several Algonquian-speaking tribes in the region. Prior to King Philip's War, tensions fluctuated between Native tribes and the colonists. The Narragansetts fought alongside the English colonists in the Pequot War and participated in the Mystic massacre but were horrified afterwards. With the defeat of the Pequots, the Narragansett leader Miantonomoh gathered groups of Algonquians together in the 1640s, in the hope that they could face the colonists together. He was captured by colonists in Connecticut and executed by the Mohegan sachem Uncas, shattering the indigenous coalition. 

The Rhode Island, Plymouth, Massachusetts Bay, Connecticut, and New Haven colonies each developed separate relations with the Wampanoags, Nipmucs, Narragansetts, Mohegans, Pequots, and other tribes of New England, whose territories historically had differing boundaries. Many of the neighboring tribes had been traditional competitors and enemies. As the colonial population increased, the New Englanders expanded their settlements along the region's coastal plain and up the Connecticut River valley. By 1675, they had established a few small towns in the interior between Boston and the Connecticut River settlements.

The Wampanoag tribe under Metacomet's leadership had entered into an agreement with the Plymouth Colony and believed that they could rely on the colony for protection. However, in the decades preceding the war, it became clear to them that the treaty did not mean that the Colonists were not allowed to settle in new territories.

Failure of diplomacy

Metacomet became sachem of the Pokanoket and Grand Sachem of the Wampanoag Confederacy in 1662 after the death of his older brother Grand Sachem Wamsutta (called "Alexander" by the colonists), who had succeeded their father Massasoit (d. 1661) as chief. Metacomet was well known to the colonists before his ascension as paramount chief to the Wampanoags, but he distrusted the colonists.

The Plymouth colonists had passed laws making it illegal to have commerce with the Wampanoags. They learned that Wamsutta had sold a parcel of land to Roger Williams, so Governor Josiah Winslow had Wamsutta arrested, even though Wampanoags who lived outside of colonist jurisdiction were not accountable to Plymouth Colony laws. Conflict between the Wampanoags and settlers increased due to the continual intrusion of settlers' livestock onto Wampanoag farms and food stores, with extremely few colonists taking more than half-hearted steps to prevent this in spite of regular complaints by the Wampanoags. Another grievance held by many Wampanoags was the persistent attempt by colonial missionaries to convert them to Christianity; among those who expressed such grievances was Metacomet himself, who declared that he and other Wampanoag leaders possessed a great fear that any of their people "should be called or forced to be Christian Indians”. Metacomet began negotiating with the other Algonquian tribes against the Plymouth Colony, in the winter of 1674–1675, soon after the death of his father and his brother.

Population
The population of New England colonists totaled about 65,000 people. They lived in 110 towns, of which 64 were in the Massachusetts Bay colony, which then included the southwestern portion of Maine and southern New Hampshire until 1679. The towns had about 16,000 men of military age who were almost all part of the militia, as universal training was prevalent in all colonial New England towns. Many towns had built strong garrison houses for defense, and others had stockades enclosing most of the houses. All of these were strengthened as the war progressed. Some poorly populated towns were abandoned if they did not have enough men to defend them.

Each town had local militias based on all eligible men who had to supply their own arms. Only those who were too old, too young, disabled, or clergy were excused from military service. The militias were usually only minimally trained and initially did relatively poorly against the warring Natives, until more effective training and tactics could be devised. Joint forces of militia volunteers and volunteer Native allies were found to be the most effective. The Native allies of the colonists numbered about 1,000 from the Mohegans and Praying Indians, with about 200 warriors.

By 1676, the regional Native population had decreased to about 10,000 (exact numbers are unavailable), largely because of epidemics. These included about 4,000 Narragansetts of western Rhode Island and eastern Connecticut, 2,400 Nipmucs of central and western Massachusetts, and 2,400 combined in the Massachusett and Pawtucket tribes living around Massachusetts Bay and extending northwest to Maine. The Wampanoags and Pokanokets of Plymouth and eastern Rhode Island are thought to have numbered fewer than 1,000. About one in four were considered to be warriors. By then, the Natives had almost universally adopted steel knives, tomahawks, and flintlock muskets as their weapons. The various tribes had no common government. They had distinct cultures and often warred among themselves, although they all spoke related languages from the Algonquian family.

The trial
John Sassamon was a Native convert to Christianity, commonly referred to as a "praying Indian." He played a key role as a "cultural mediator," negotiating with both colonists and Natives while belonging to neither party. He was an early graduate of Harvard College and served as a translator and adviser to Metacomet. He reported to the governor of Plymouth Colony that Metacomet planned to gather allies for Native attacks on widely dispersed colonial settlements.

Metacomet was brought before a public court, where court officials admitted that they had no proof but warned that they would confiscate Wampanoag land and guns if they had any further reports that he was conspiring to start a war. Not long after, Sassamon's body was found in the ice-covered Assawompset Pond, and Plymouth Colony officials arrested three Wampanoags on the testimony of a Native witness, including one of Metacomet's counselors. A jury that included six Native elders convicted the men of Sassamon's murder, and they were executed by hanging on June 8, 1675 (O.S.), at Plymouth.

Southern theater, 1675

Raid on Swansea 
A band of Pokanokets attacked several isolated homesteads in the small Plymouth colony settlement of Swansea on June 20, 1675. They laid siege to the town, then destroyed it five days later and killed several more people. On June 27, 1675, a full eclipse of the moon occurred in the New England area, and various tribes in New England thought it a good omen for attacking the colonists. Officials from the Plymouth and Massachusetts Bay colonies responded quickly to the attacks on Swansea; on June 28, they sent a punitive military expedition that destroyed the Wampanoag town at Mount Hope in Bristol, Rhode Island.

The war quickly spread and soon involved the Podunk and Nipmuc tribes. During the summer of 1675, the Natives attacked at Middleborough and Dartmouth, Massachusetts (July 8), Mendon, Massachusetts (July 14), Brookfield, Massachusetts (August 2), and Lancaster, Massachusetts (August 9). In early September, they attacked Deerfield, Hadley, and Northfield, Massachusetts.

Siege of Brookfield 
Wheeler's Surprise and the ensuing Siege of Brookfield were fought in August 1675 between Nipmuc Natives under Muttawmp and the colonists of Massachusetts Bay under the command of Thomas Wheeler and Captain Edward Hutchinson. The battle consisted of an initial ambush on August 2, 1675, by the Nipmucs against Wheeler's unsuspecting party. Eight men from Wheeler's company died during the ambush: Zechariah Phillips of Boston, Timothy Farlow of Billerica, Edward Coleborn of Chelmsford, Samuel Smedly of Concord, Shadrach Hapgood of Sudbury, Sergeant Eyres, Sergeant Prichard, and Corporal Coy of Brookfield. Following the ambush was an attack on Brookfield, Massachusetts, and the consequent besieging of the remains of the colonial force. The Nipmuc forces harried the settlers for two days, until they were driven off by a newly arrived force of colonial soldiers under the command of Major Simon Willard. The siege took place at Ayers' Garrison in West Brookfield, but the location of the initial ambush was a subject of extensive controversy among historians in the late nineteenth century.

The New England Confederation comprised the Massachusetts Bay Colony, Plymouth Colony, New Haven Colony, and Connecticut Colony; they declared war on the Natives on September 9, 1675. The Colony of Rhode Island and Providence Plantations tried to remain neutral, but much of the war was fought on Rhode Island soil; Providence and Warwick suffered extensive damage from the Natives.

The next colonial expedition was to recover crops from abandoned fields along the Connecticut River for the coming winter and included almost 100 farmers and militia, plus teamsters to drive the wagons.

Battle of Bloody Brook 
The Battle of Bloody Brook was fought on September 12, 1675, between militia from the Massachusetts Bay Colony and a band of Natives led by Nipmuc sachem Muttawmp. The Natives ambushed colonists escorting a train of wagons carrying the harvest from Deerfield to Hadley. They killed at least 40 militia men and 17 teamsters out of a company that included 79 militia.

Attack on Springfield
The Natives next attacked Springfield, Massachusetts, on October 5, 1675, the Connecticut River's largest settlement at the time. They burned to the ground nearly all of Springfield's buildings, including the town's grist mill. Most of the Springfielders who escaped unharmed took cover at the house of Miles Morgan, a resident who had constructed one of the settlement's few fortified blockhouses. A Native servant who worked for Morgan managed to escape and alerted the Massachusetts Bay troops under the command of Major Samuel Appleton, who broke through to Springfield and drove off the attackers.

Morgan's sons were famous Native fighters in the territory. His son Peletiah was killed by Natives in 1675. Springfielders later honored Miles Morgan with a large statue in Court Square.

The Great Swamp Fight

The Narragansetts endeavored to remain neutral in the war, driven partly by their relationship with Roger Williams. Although not directly involved in the war, they had sheltered many of the Wampanoag fighters, women, and children, and there were questions about some of their warriors participating in several Native attacks.  In October of 1675, The Narraganset sachem Canonchet signed a "Treaty of Neutrality" with the Massachusetts Bay Colony, but the distrust by the colonists remained.

On November 2, Plymouth Colony governor Josiah Winslow led a combined force of Plymouth, Massachusetts, and Connecticut militia against the Narragansett tribe. The colonists distrusted the tribe and did not understand the various alliances. As the colonial forces went through Rhode Island, they found and burned several Native towns which had been abandoned by the Narragansetts, who had retreated to a massive fort in a frozen swamp. The cold weather in December froze the swamp so that it was relatively easy to traverse. The colonial force found the Narragansett fort on December 19, 1675, near present-day South Kingstown, Rhode Island. about 1,000 troops attacked, including about 150 native allies (Pequots and Mohegans). The fierce battle that followed is known as the Great Swamp Fight. It is believed that the militia killed about 600 Narragansetts.

Most of the Narragansett warriors escaped into the frozen swamp. The colonists lost about 70 men killed and nearly 150 more wounded, if including many of their officers. The surviving militia returned to their homes, lacking supplies for an extended campaign. The nearby towns in Rhode Island provided care for the wounded until they could return to their homes.

In the spring of 1676, the Narragansetts counterattacked under Canonchet, assembling an army of 2,000 braves. They burned Providence, including Roger William's house. The Narragansetts were finally defeated when Canonchet was captured and executed in April 1676; then female sachem Queen Quaiapen drowned on July 2 attempting to cross a river.

Mohawk intervention 
In December 1675, Metacomet established a winter camp in Schaghticoke, New York. His reason for moving into New York has been attributed to a desire to enlist Mohawk aid in the conflict. Though New York was a non-belligerent, Governor Edmund Andros was nonetheless concerned at the arrival of the Wampanoag sachem. Either with Andros' sanction, or of their own accord, the Mohawk—traditional rivals of the Algonquian people—launched a surprise assault against a 500-warrior band under Metacomet's command the following February. The "ruthless" coup de main resulted in the death of between 70 and 460 of the Wampanoag. His forces crippled, Metacomet withdrew to New England, pursued "relentlessly" by Mohawk forces who attacked Algonquian settlements and ambushed their supply parties.

Over the next several months, fear of Mohawk attack led some Wampanoag to surrender to the colonists, and one historian described the decision of the Mohawk to engage Metacomet's forces as "the blow that lost the war for Philip".

Native campaign
Natives attacked and destroyed more settlements throughout the winter of 1675–1676 in their effort to annihilate the colonists. Attacks were made at Andover, Bridgewater, Chelmsford, Groton, Lancaster, Marlborough, Medfield, Medford, Portland, Providence, Rehoboth, Scituate, Seekonk, Simsbury, Sudbury, Suffield, Warwick, Weymouth, and Wrentham, including modern-day Norfolk and Plainville. The famous account written and published by Mary Rowlandson after the war gives a colonial captive's perspective on the conflict.

Southern theater, 1676

Lancaster raid 

The Lancaster raid in February 1676 was a Native attack on the community of Lancaster, Massachusetts. Philip led a force of 1,500 Wampanoag, Nipmuc, and Narragansett Natives in a dawn attack on the isolated village, which then included all or part of the neighboring modern communities of Bolton and Clinton. They attacked five fortified houses. The house of the Rev. Joseph Rowlandson was set on fire, and most of its occupants were slaughtered—more than 30 people. Rowlandson's wife Mary was taken prisoner, and afterward wrote a best-selling captivity narrative of her experiences. Many of the community's other houses were destroyed before the Natives retreated northward.

Plymouth Plantation Campaign 

The spring of 1676 marked the high point for the combined tribes when they attacked Plymouth Plantation on March 12. The town withstood the assault, but the Natives had demonstrated their ability to penetrate deep into colonial territory. They attacked three more settlements; Longmeadow (near Springfield), Marlborough, and Simsbury were attacked two weeks later. They killed Captain Pierce and a company of Massachusetts soldiers between Pawtucket and the Blackstone's settlement. Several colonial men were tortured and buried at Nine Men's Misery in Cumberland as part of the Natives' ritual torture of enemies. They also burned the settlement of Providence to the ground on March 29. At the same time, a small band of Natives infiltrated and burned part of Springfield while the militia was away.

The settlements within the modern-day state of Rhode Island became a literal island colony for a time as the settlements at Providence and Warwick were sacked and burned, and the residents were driven to Newport and Portsmouth on Rhode Island. The Connecticut River towns had thousands of acres of cultivated crop land known as the bread basket of New England, but they had to limit their plantings and work in large armed groups for self-protection. Towns such as Springfield, Hatfield, Hadley, and Northampton, Massachusetts, fortified themselves, reinforced their militias, and held their ground, though attacked several times. The small towns of Northfield, Deerfield, and several others were abandoned as the surviving settlers retreated to the larger towns. The towns of the Connecticut colony were largely unharmed in the war, although more than 100 Connecticut militia died in their support of the other colonies.

Attack on Sudbury 
The Attack on Sudbury was fought in Sudbury, Massachusetts, on April 21, 1676. The town was surprised by Native raiders at dawn, who besieged a local garrison house and burned several unoccupied homes and farms. Reinforcements that arrived from nearby towns were drawn into ambushes by the Natives; Captain Samuel Wadsworth lost his life and half of a 70-man militia in such an ambush.

Falls Fight 
On May 19, 1676, Captain William Turner of the Massachusetts Militia and about 150 militia volunteers (mostly minimally trained farmers) attacked a Native fishing camp at Peskeopscut on the Connecticut River, now called Turners Falls, Massachusetts. The colonists massacred 100–200 Natives in retaliation for earlier Native attacks against Deerfield and other settlements and for the colonial losses in the Battle of Bloody Brook. Turner and nearly 40 of the militia were killed during the return from the falls.

The colonists defeated an attack at Hadley on June 12, 1676 with the help of their Mohegan allies, scattering most of the Native survivors into New Hampshire and farther north. Later that month, a force of 250 Natives was routed near Marlborough, Massachusetts. Combined forces of colonial volunteers and their Native allies continued to attack, kill, capture, or disperse bands of Narragansetts, Nipmucs, and Wampanoags as they tried to plant crops or return to their traditional locations. The colonists granted amnesty to those who surrendered or who were captured and showed that they had not participated in the conflict. Captives who had participated in attacks on the many settlements were hanged, enslaved, or put to indentured servitude, depending upon the colony involved.

Second Battle of Nipsachuck 
The Second Battle of Nipsachuck occurred on July 2, 1676 and included a rare use of a cavalry charge by the English colonists. In the summer of 1676, a band of over 100 Narragansetts led by female sachem Quaiapen returned to northern Rhode Island, apparently seeking to recover cached seed corn for planting. They were attacked by a force of 400, composed of 300 Connecticut colonial militia and about 100 Mohegan and Pequot warriors, and Quaiapen was killed along with the leaders as they sought refuge in Mattekonnit (Mattity) Swamp in what is now North Smithfield, while the remainder of the survivors were sold into slavery.

Capture at Mount Hope 

Metacomet's allies began to desert him, and more than 400 had surrendered to the colonists by early July. Metacomet took refuge back at Assawompset Pond, the Wampanoag settlement near which John Sassamon had initially been found dead before the outset of the war, but the colonists formed raiding parties with native allies, and he retreated southwest towards present-day Rhode Island. Metacomet was killed by one of these teams when he was tracked down by Captain Benjamin Church and Captain Josiah Standish of the Plymouth Colony militia at Mount Hope in Bristol, Rhode Island. He was shot and killed by a native named John Alderman on August 12, 1676. Metacomet's corpse was beheaded, then drawn and quartered, a traditional punishment for high treason in Great Britain in this time period. His head was displayed in Plymouth for a generation.

Captain Church and his soldiers captured Pocasset war chief Anawan on August 28, 1676, at Anawan Rock in Rehoboth, Massachusetts. He was an old man at the time, though a chief captain of Metacomet. His capture marked the final event in King Philip's War, as he was also beheaded.

Northern Theater (Maine and Acadia) 

Before the outbreak of war, English settlers in Maine and New Hampshire lived peaceably with their Wabanaki neighbors. Colonists engaged in fishing, harvesting timber, and trade with Natives. By 1657 English towns and trading posts stretched along the coast eastward to the Kennebec River. These communities were scattered and lacked fortifications. The defenseless posture of English settlements reflected the amicable relationship between Wabanakis and colonists to that time.

Upon hearing news of the Wampanoag attack on Swansea, colonists in York marched up the Kennebec River in June 1675 and demanded that Wabanakis turn over their guns and ammunition as a sign of goodwill. Apart from being an affront to their sovereignty, Natives depended on their guns to hunt. After handing over some of their weapons, many Wabanakis starved the following winter. English colonists exacerbated tensions by shooting at Penobscots in Casco Bay and drowning the infant son of Pequawket sagamore Squando. Impelled by hunger and English violence, Wabanakis began raiding trading posts and attacking settlers.

Under the leadership of Androscoggin sagamore Mogg Hegon and Penobscot sagamore Madockawando, Wabanakis annihilated English presence east of the Saco River. Three major campaigns (one each year) were launched by the Natives in 1675, 1676, and 1677, most of which led to a massive colonial response. Richard Waldron and Charles Frost led the English colonial forces in the northern region. Waldron sent forces that attacked the Mi'kmaq in Acadia.

Throughout the campaigns, Mogg Hegon repeatedly attacked towns such as Black Point (Scarborough), Wells, and Damariscove, building a Native navy out of the approximately 40 sloops and a dozen 30-ton ships previously armed by militia. Maine's fishing industry was completely destroyed by the Wabanaki flotilla. Records from Salem record 20 ketches stolen and destroyed in one raid in Maine.

Colonial responses to Wabanaki attacks generally failed in both their objectives and accomplishments. Likely upon learning that Mohawks had agreed to enter the war on New England's side, Wabanakis sued for peace in 1677. The official fighting ended in the northern theater with the Treaty of Casco (1678). The treaty allowed English settlers to return to Maine and acknowledged Wabanaki triumph in the conflict by requiring each English family to pay Wabanakis a peck of corn each year as tribute.

By the end of the war, the Northern Campaigns saw approximately 400 settlers die, Maine's fishing economy eviscerated, and the Natives maintaining power in eastern and northern Maine. There is not an accurate account of the number of Natives who died, but it is thought to be between 100 and 300.

Role of Dedham

 
During the war, men from Dedham went off to fight and several died. More former Dedhamites who had moved on to other towns died than men who were still living in the community, however. They included Robert Hinsdale, his four sons, and Jonathan Plympton who died at the Battle of Bloody Brook. John Plympton was burned at the stake after being marched to Canada with Quentin Stockwell. 

Zachariah Smith was passing through Dedham on April 12, 1671 when he stopped at the home of Caleb Church in the "sawmill settlement" on the banks of the Neponset River. The next morning he was found dead, having been shot. A group of praying Indians found him and suspicion fell on a group on non-Christian Nipmucs who were also heading south to Providence. This was the "first actual outrage of King Phillip's War." One of the Nipmucs, a son of Matoonas, was found guilty and hanged on Boston Common. For the next six years his head would be impaled on a pike at the end of the gallows as a warning to other native peoples. Dedham then readied its cannon, which had been issued by the colony in 1650, in preparation for an attack that never came.

After the raid on Swansea, the colony ordered the militias of several towns, including Dedham, to have 100 soldiers ready to march out of town on an hour's notice. Captain Daniel Henchmen took command of the men and left Boston on June 26, 1675. They arrived in Dedham by nightfall and the troops became worried by an eclipse of the moon, which they took as a bad omen. Some claimed to see native scalplocks and bows in the moon. Dedham was largely spared from the fighting and was not attacked, but they did build a fortification and offered tax cuts to men who joined the cavalry.

Plymouth Colony governor Josiah Winslow and Captain Benjamin Church rode from Boston to Dedham to take charge of the 465 soldiers and 275 cavalry assembling there and together departed on December 8, 1675 for the Great Swamp Fight. When the commanders arrived, they also found "a vast assortment of teamsters, volunteers, servants, service personnel, and hangers-on." Dedham's John Bacon died in the battle. 

During the battle in Lancaster in February 1676, Jonas Fairbanks and his son Joshua both died. Richard Wheeler, whose son Joseph was killed in battle the previous August, also died that day. When the town of Medfield was attacked, they fired a cannon as a warning to Dedham. Residents of nearby Wrentham abandoned their community and fled for the safety of Dedham and Boston.

Pumham, one of Phillip's chief advisors, was captured in Dedham on July 25, 1676. Several Christian Indians had seen his band in the woods, nearly starved to death. Captain Samuel Hunting led 36 men from Dedham and Medfield and joined 90 Indians on a hunt to find them. A total of 15 of the enemy were killed and 35 were captured. Pumham, though he was so wounded he could not stand, grabbed hold of an English soldier and would have killed him had one of the settler's compatriots not come to his rescue.

John Plympton and Quentin Stockwell were captured in Deerfield in September 1677 and marched to Canada. Stockell was eventually ransomed and wrote an account of his ordeal, but Plympton was burned at the stake.

Aftermath

Southern New England 
The war in southern New England largely ended with Metacomet's death. More than 1,000 colonists and 3,000 Natives had died. More than half of all New England towns were attacked by Native warriors, and many were completely destroyed. Several Natives were enslaved and transported to Bermuda, including Metacomet's son, and numerous Bermudians today claim ancestry from the Native exiles. Members of the sachem's extended family were placed among colonists in Rhode Island and eastern Connecticut. Other survivors joined western and northern tribes and refugee communities as captives or tribal members. Some of the Native refugees returned to southern New England. The Narragansetts, Wampanoags, Podunks, Nipmucks suffered substantial losses, several smaller bands were virtually eliminated as organized bands, and even the Mohegans were greatly weakened.

The Colony of Rhode Island was devastated by the war, as its principal city Providence was destroyed. Nevertheless, the Rhode Island legislature issued a formal rebuke to Connecticut Governor John Winthrop on October 26, scarcely six months after the burning of the city—although Winthrop had died. The "official letter" places blame squarely on the United Colonies of New England for causing the war by provoking the Narragansetts.

Sir Edmund Andros had been appointed governor of New York in 1674 by the Duke of York, who claimed that his authority extended as far north as Maine's northern boundary. He negotiated a treaty with some of the northern Native bands in Maine on April 12, 1678. Metacomet's Pennacook allies had made a separate peace with the colonists as the result of early battles that are sometimes identified as part of King Philip's War. The tribe nevertheless lost members and eventually its identity as the result of the war.

Plymouth Colony 
Plymouth Colony lost close to eight percent of its adult male population and a smaller percentage of women and children to Native warfare or other causes associated with the war. Native losses were much greater, with about 2,000 men killed or who died of injuries in the war, more than 3,000 dying of sickness or starvation, and another 1,000 Natives sold into slavery and transported to other areas, first to British-controlled islands in the Caribbean such as Jamaica and Barbados, then, as captives from the war were banned for further sale, Natives were sold to non-British markets in Spain, Portugal, the Azores, and Madeira.

Northern New England 
In northern New England, conflict continued for decades in Maine, New Hampshire, and northern Massachusetts. Wabanakis gradually entered the French orbit as English incursions on their territory continued. There were six wars over the next 74 years between New France and New England, along with their respective Native allies, starting with King William's War in 1689. (See the French and Native Wars, Father Rale's War, and Father Le Loutre's War.) The conflict in northern New England was largely over the border between New England and Acadia, which New France defined as the Kennebec River in southern Maine. Many colonists from northeastern Maine and Massachusetts temporarily relocated to larger towns in Massachusetts and New Hampshire to avoid Wabanaki raids.

See also
 American Indian Wars
 Colonial American military history
 Irish Donation of 1676
 Kieft's War
 List of Indian massacres

Explanatory notes

Citations

Works cited

General bibliography

Primary sources
 
 
  - John Easton's account first published

Secondary sources

Further reading

External links

 Martin, Susan S. (ed.). "Edward Randolph on the Causes of the King Philip's War (1685)". New England Indians.
 .
 
 

 
1670s conflicts
1670s in the Thirteen Colonies
1675 in the Thirteen Colonies
1676 in the Thirteen Colonies
1677 in the Thirteen Colonies
1678 in the Thirteen Colonies
Colony of Rhode Island and Providence Plantations
Colonial American and Indian wars
Connecticut Colony
Colonial Massachusetts
History of Providence, Rhode Island
History of Springfield, Massachusetts
Military history of the Thirteen Colonies
Narragansett tribe
Wampanoag
Native American history of Connecticut
Native American history of Massachusetts
Native American history of Rhode Island